Solidago azorica is a species of goldenrod in the family Asteraceae, endemic to the Azores, Portugal. It is closely related to Solidago sempervirens, native to eastern North America, but in addition to the morphological differences there is a clear genetic separation between the two species. This species is thought to have evolved from its American relative from a natural introduction made well before human occupation on the islands.

Description

Distribution
It is found in coastal cliffs, lava flows and sand or stone deposits in rough terrain. It occurs dispersed in coastal meadows dominated by Festuca petraea, as well as in heavily exposed habitats, along paths and along stone walls. Up to about  altitude ( in Flores). It is present in all of the nine Azorean islands.

References

azorica
Endemic flora of the Azores